C-Note may refer to:
 C-Note (album), an album by the musician Prince
 C-Note (band), an Orlando boy band
 C-Note (rapper), an American rapper
 C-note (bill), slang for the United States one-hundred-dollar bill
 C (musical note), the first note of the C major scale
 C-Note (Prison Break), a character in Prison Break
 cNote (film), an animated short by Christopher Hinton
 The C Note, an episode of Recess

See also
Lil' C-Note, a stage name of Carlon Jeffery
Lil C-Note, a stage name of Corey Jackson (rapper)